Austroclavus undatus is a species of sea snail, a marine gastropod mollusk in the superfamily Conoidea, unassigned to a family

Description

Distribution
This marine species is endemic to Australia and occurs off New South Wales and Western Australia

References

 Hedley, C. 1907. The results of deep sea investigation in the Tasman Sea. Mollusca from eighty fathoms off Narrabeen. Records of the Australian Museum 6: 283–304
 Cotton, B.C. 1947. Australian Recent and Tertiary Turridae. Adelaide : Field Naturalist's Section of the Royal Society of South Australia. Conchology Club Vol. 4 pp. 1–34.
 Wells F.E. (1991) A revision of the Recent Australian species of the turrid genera Clavus, Plagiostropha, and Tylotiella (Mollusca: Gastropoda). Journal of the Malacological Society of Australia 12: 1–33. [31 October 1991] 
 Wilson, B. 1994. Australian Marine Shells. Prosobranch Gastropods. Kallaroo, WA : Odyssey Publishing Vol. 2 370 pp.

External links

undatus
Conoidea
Gastropods of Australia